Agnel Polytechnic is a polytechnic college which has adopted the education system from Maharashtra Board of Technical Education (MSBTE) located in Vashi [Juhu Nagar]  the heart of Navi Mumbai, a satellite city to the metropolis of Mumbai in Maharashtra, India. It is the 'first and only' educational institution accredited by the National Board of Accreditation in Navi Mumbai. The technical institute offers diploma courses in the fields of electronics and telecommunications engineering, civil engineering, mechanical engineering and automobile engineering. The college is dominantly controlled by the principal Mrs Saly Antony. It is a part of the Father Agnel Ashram's family of educational institutions spread across India subsidiary to the Fr. Conceicao Rodrigues Institute of Technology. It is popularly known as the 'Fr. Agnel Polytechnic.'

Campus

Agnel Polytechnic is located in the Agnel Technical Education Complex, Sector - 9A,Juhu Nagar Vashi. It stands besides the biggest Mosque in Navi Mumbai. The whole campus is designed for the urban outlook. It mainly consists of the engineering college, the Central Library and then the Polytechnic, canteen, workshop, quarters and Father Saturnino Almeida's residence, Omkar all the way around the large campus. It is the largest campus in Navi Mumbai. College staff are given the facility to stay in the quarters with their families.

Student activities
The Agnel council was formed in the year 2004. From this year onwards various events are being conducted by the staff and students of the institute for the overall development of the students, for example, Technocratz (Technical event), Zest (Sports festival), Resonance (Cultural festival) and other activities such as alumni meet.  This also includes an Agnel Social Cell to enable the students to understand and serve the society.

See also
 University of Mumbai
 Agnel Ashram
 Fr. Conceicao Rodrigues College of Engineering (FCRCE)

External links
 Agnel Polytechnic, Vashi
Agnel Student Council
 Fr. Conceicao Rodrigues Institute of Technology (FCRIT), Vashi

Education in Navi Mumbai